Freriks is a Dutch surname. Notable people with this surname include:

 Merel Freriks (born 1998), Dutch handball player
 Nico Freriks (born 1981), Dutch volleyball player
 Philip Freriks (born 1944), Dutch journalist, columnist and television presenter
 Suzanne Freriks (born 1984), Dutch volleyball player

Dutch-language surnames